The 1987–88 2. Bundesliga season was the fourteenth season of the 2. Bundesliga, the second tier of the German football league system.

Stuttgarter Kickers and FC St. Pauli were promoted to the Bundesliga while Rot-Weiß Oberhausen, BVL 08 Remscheid, SSV Ulm 1846 and Arminia Bielefeld were relegated to the Oberliga.

League table
For the 1987–88 season Kickers Offenbach, SpVgg Bayreuth, SV Meppen and BVL 08 Remscheid were newly promoted to the 2. Bundesliga from the Oberliga while SpVgg Blau-Weiß 1890 Berlin and Fortuna Düsseldorf had been relegated to the league from the Bundesliga.

Results

Top scorers 
The league's top scorers:

References

External links
 2. Bundesliga 1987/1988 at Weltfussball.de 
 1987–88 2. Bundesliga at kicker.de 

1987-88
2
Ger